Craig Martin may refer to:

Craig Martin (Canadian soccer) (born 1957), former Canadian national soccer team player
Craig Martin (South African soccer) (born 1993), South African soccer player
Craig Martin (ice hockey) (born 1971), retired Canadian professional ice hockey player
Craig L. Martin, chief executive officer of Jacobs Engineering Group

See also
Crag martin, four species of birds in the swallow family
Michael Craig-Martin (born 1941), British contemporary artist